Over 3000 cultivars of the pear are known. The following is a list of the more common and important cultivars, with the year and place of origin (where documented) and an indication of whether the pears are for cooking, eating, or making perry. Those varieties marked  have gained the Royal Horticultural Society's Award of Garden Merit.

Table of pears

Perry pears 
Perry pears may be far too sour or bitter for fresh eating, but are used for making perry, the pear equivalent of the alcoholic beverage apple cider. Some pears (especially older ones from the U.S. and Canada) are used for both cider and eating purposes.

Gallery

References 

 
Lists of cultivars
Lists of foods